Gwynedd Valley is an unincorporated community in Lower Gwynedd Township in Montgomery County, Pennsylvania, United States. Gwynedd Valley is located along Plymouth Road, southwest of the Wissahickon Creek. It is served by the Gwynedd Valley station on SEPTA's Lansdale/Doylestown Line.

See also
Gwynedd Mercy University

References

Unincorporated communities in Montgomery County, Pennsylvania
Unincorporated communities in Pennsylvania